IK Franke is a Swedish sports club located in Västerås in Västmanland.

Background
Idrottsklubben Franke was formed in 1943 and its main activity has been  football despite the initial success came in bandy when the club won the national juniors championship in 1958.  At youth level the football club has fostered future national team players such as Gary Sundgren and Pontus Kåmark.  In 2010 the first team has been coached by Peter Markstedt, the former Hammarby IF player.

Since their foundation IK Franke has participated mainly in the middle and lower divisions of the Swedish football league system.  The men's team currently plays in Division 3 Västra Svealand which is the fifth tier of Swedish football. The women's team plays at a similar level. The teams play their home matches at the Råby IP in Västerås.

IK Franke are affiliated to the Västmanlands Fotbollförbund.

Season to season

Attendances

In recent seasons IK Franke have had the following average attendances:

Footnotes

External links
 IK Franke – Official website
 IK Franke Facebook

Sport in Västerås
Football clubs in Västmanland County
Bandy clubs in Sweden
Association football clubs established in 1943
Bandy clubs established in 1943
1943 establishments in Sweden